Khatuna Fekhra was a 12th-century Yazidi female saint.

The Quba Xatuna Fexra (Temple of Khatuna Fekhra) in Mağara, İdil, Şırnak Province, southeastern Turkey was built in honor of her. There is also a shrine built in honor of her in Lalish.

Khatuna Fekhra was the daughter of Sheykh Fekhr, wife of Hesen Jellê, and sister of Sheikh Mand and Sheikh Bedir. She is the patron of childbirth.

See also
List of Yazidi holy figures
List of Yazidi holy places

References

External link

12th-century births
12th-century deaths
Yazidi holy figures
12th-century Kurdish people
Yazidi women
12th-century women
Kurdish words and phrases